Shalini Khanna (Punjabi: ਸ਼ਾਲਿਨੀ ਖੰਨਾ) is an Indian actress working in TV and Bollywood industry.  She debuted with the Hindi soap drama Kutumb, and is mostly known for work of Pallavi in Comedy series Sajan Re Jhoot Mat Bolo.  She hails from a Punjabi background.

Biography
As a part of her summer training, she worked as a copywriter on contract with an advertising firm in Mumbai.  She then worked for Times Of India (Bombay Times) in the marketing department, and also worked with Zee TV as a copywriter.

While still a student, she performed theatre work in Bhopal while also working in Mumbai.  During this time she realized acting gave her much more creative satisfaction and an ability to live different lives and characters.

She is married to actor Bhanu Uday.

Filmography

Films
71/2 Phere (as Shauni Khanna) - Show writer Kavita

TV
Kutumb -
 Kumkum  Ek Pyara Sa Bandhan as Malini (Malli)
Babul Ka Aangann Chootey Na
Yeh Chanda Kanoon Hai
Sajan Re Jhoot Mat Bolo - Pallavi
Chidiya Ghar - Saaj
Golmaal Hai Bhai Sab Golmaal Hai - Ananoya
Baal Veer - One of Bhayankar Pari's form
Kareena Kareena
Jabb Love Hua

References

External links

Punjabi people
Indian television actresses
21st-century Indian actresses
Living people
1983 births
Actresses in Hindi television